Conor Renier Friedersdorf is an American journalist and a staff writer at The Atlantic, known for his civil libertarian perspectives.

Early life and career
He attended Pomona College as an undergraduate, and attended the journalism school at New York University on a scholarship. After graduating from college, Friedersdorf worked for the Inland Valley Daily Bulletin. He began writing for The Atlantic in November 2009. He was an intern for The Daily Dish blog, and in 2010 was hired as Senior Editor and "underblogger" to Andrew Sullivan. Friedersdorf compiles on a regular basis The Best of Journalism list, which is a curated list of news articles and investigative report, that he disseminates through a newsletter.

Views
In an interview with journalist Matt Lewis, Friedersdorf stated that he has right-leaning views but that he does not consider himself to be a doctrinal conservative or a member of the conservative movement. Writing for The Atlantic, Friedersdorf laid out his argument for why he refused to vote for Barack Obama in 2012 and was supporting Gary Johnson in his bid for president as the Libertarian Party candidate.

Friedersdorf wrote an article calling for the abolition of U.S. Immigration and Customs Enforcement, and protecting the right to protest on the Statue of Liberty. Friedersdorf has praised Peggy McIntosh's essay "White Privilege: Unpacking the Invisible Knapsack", saying he would encourage its study in college curriculums, but warned that "importing obscure academic concepts into mass conversations about identity makes them much less accessible and more alienating to the vast majority of America".

Personal life
Friedersdorf grew up in Orange County, California, and currently lives in Venice, California. Two of his grandparents were French Cajuns.

References

External links
 Conor Friedersdorf at The Atlantic
 
 Conor Friedersdorf on Twitter

Year of birth missing (living people)
Living people
American people of Acadian descent
American male journalists
American political commentators
American political writers
The Atlantic (magazine) people
New York University alumni
Pomona College alumni
21st-century American journalists
People from Orange County, California
Journalists from California
American libertarians